Donna Fox (born 22 October 1984), is a British Women's International motorcycle trials rider.  Fox was  a member of the winning British Women's TDN team in 2006-2007 and 2015.

Biography
Fox finished runner up to Maria Conway in the inaugural British Women's Trials Championship in 2002, losing out by a mere 5 points. That year she made her international debut competing in both the FIM Women's World Trials Championship and as a member of the British team at the annual FIM Trial Des Nations, held in Portugal. She placed 6th in the World Championships.

In 2005 Fox was again runner up in the British Championship, this time to TDN teammate Rebekah Cook. She rode with Cook again in 2006 as a member of the British TDN Team along with Maria Conway and lifted her first major silverware as the British Women's team took the title in France ahead of a strong Spanish team. The British team composed of the same riders repeated the victory in 2007 when the TDN was held on the Isle of Man, this time heading off the German team.

Fox continued to ride in both the British and World rounds for the following years, finishing runner up once again to Cook in 2009 and taking 3rd spot in 2011, 2012, 2013 and 2015. 2015 also saw Fox return to the British TDN team where, alongside teammates Emma Bristow and Rebekah Cook they won the event, this time held in Spain. The trio of British riders also stole the show in the FIM Women's World Championships with Bristow taking the title followed by Cook and Fox taking a career best 3rd in the championship.

National Trials Championship Career

International Trials Championship Career

Honors
 British Women's Trial Des Nations Winning Team Member 2006, 2007, 2015, 2016, 2018

References 

1984 births
Living people
Sportspeople from Doncaster
English sportswomen
English motorcycle racers
Motorcycle trials riders
Female motorcycle racers